The wedding of Haakon, Crown Prince of Norway and Mette-Marit Tjessem Høiby took place on 25 August 2001 at Oslo Cathedral. It was the first royal wedding to take place in Norway since the marriage of then-Crown Prince Harald to Sonja Haraldsen in 1968. Because of the background of the bride, the wedding was frequently referred to in publications as "unconventional" and "uncommon," and Mette-Marit as a modern-day Cinderella.

Courtship and engagement
Crown Prince Haakon met Mette-Marit Tjessem Høiby through mutual friends in 1999. Their relationship was not without controversy, as she was a former waitress with a four-year-old son from a previous relationship with a man with a drug conviction. After rumors abounded that Mette-Marit had a "well-known past in Oslo's dance-and-drugs house-party scene," she also admitted to previous drug abuse and a history of heavy partying.

The couple's eight-month-long engagement included a period of cohabitation in an Oslo apartment, which was disapproved of by the conservative Church of Norway. According to The New York Times, support for the monarchy as an institution hit a record low during this period, though 60 percent still considered themselves monarchists. Though surveys reported that most Norwegians did not mind the couple had lived together or that she was a single mother, the royal family did lose popularity as the details emerged about her drug past.

The prince's father, Harald V of Norway was supportive of his son's decision, as he had spent nearly a decade trying to persuade his own father to allow him to marry commoner, Sonja Haraldsen. There were rumors in the Norwegian press that various conservative sources were trying to pressure Haakon to consider giving up his claim to the throne, much like Edward VIII did with Wallis Simpson. Three days before the wedding, Haakon held a news conference in which he thanked his family and his country for not making their relationship a succession issue. A week before the wedding, Mette-Marit spoke out against drug use in a press conference. Though she did not admit to drug abuse, she stated "I would like to take this opportunity to say that I condemn drugs... I hope that I can now avoid talking more about my past, and that the press will respect this wish". An opinion poll afterwards indicated a swing in public support, with 40 percent stating they had a better opinion of her and 84 percent believing she was honest about her past.

Wedding

Haakon and Mette-Marit married on 25 August 2001 in Oslo. The ceremony lasted one hour, and the bride wept throughout the entire ceremony. Mette-Marit wore a dress of white silk crepe with a 20-foot long veil, while Haakon wore a black army uniform with a red sash and medals.

In a break of tradition, the groom waited outside the door of the church, as Mette-Marit wanted to walk down the aisle alongside Haakon instead of on her father's arm. Oslo Bishop Gunnar Stålsett told the couple "You have not chosen the easiest path, but love has triumphed," bringing tears to Mette-Marit's eyes.

Her son served as a page boy during the ceremony, while Crown Prince Frederik of Denmark served as Haakon's best man. Betina and Emilie Swanstrøm, Kamilla and Anniken Bjørnøy, and Tuva Høiby served as Mette-Marit's bridesmaids.

The ceremony featured music from Norwegian jazz musician Jan Garbarek, as well as text readings from Haakon's sister Princess Märtha Louise of Norway and Crown Princess Victoria of Sweden.

Upon their marriage, Mette-Marit became known as Her Royal Highness Crown Princess Mette-Marit. After the ceremony, the couple appeared with Mette-Marit's son Marius on the balcony of the royal palace in the midst of cannons firing and bands playing.

Notable people in attendance
Four kings, five queens, and six heirs to the throne were in attendance. Other notable attendees include:

The Norwegian Royal Family
 The King and Queen of Norway, the groom's parents
 Princess Märtha Louise of Norway, the groom's sister
 Princess Ragnhild, Mrs. Lorentzen and Erling Lorentzen, the groom's paternal aunt and uncle
 Princess Astrid, Mrs. Ferner and Johan Ferner, the groom's paternal aunt and uncle

Foreign royalty

  The Queen of Denmark
  The Crown Prince of Denmark (Haakon's best man)
  Prince Joachim and Princess Alexandra of Denmark
  Princess Benedikte of Denmark and The Prince of Sayn-Wittgenstein-Berleburg
  The Hereditary Prince of Sayn-Wittgenstein-Berleburg
  Princess Alexandra of Sayn-Wittgenstein-Berleburg and Count Jefferson von Pfeil und Klein-Ellguth
  Princess Nathalie of Sayn-Wittgenstein-Berleburg
  Count Flemming Valdemar and Countess Ruth of Rosenborg
  The King and Queen of Sweden
  The Crown Princess of Sweden
  Prince Carl Philip, Duke of Värmland
  Princess Madeleine, Duchess of Hälsingland and Gästrikland
  Prince Carl and Princess Kristine Bernadotte, the groom's paternal granduncle and grandaunt
  The Queen of Spain (representing the King of Spain)
  The Prince of Asturias
  The King and Queen of the Belgians
  The Duke of Brabant
  Grand Duke Jean and Grand Duchess Joséphine-Charlotte of Luxembourg
  The Grand Duke and Grand Duchess of Luxembourg
  The Hereditary Grand Duke of Luxembourg
  Prince Guillaume and Princess Sibilla of Luxembourg
 King Constantine II and Queen Anne-Marie of the Hellenes
 Princess Alexia of Greece and Denmark, Mrs. Morales and Carlos Morales
 Prince Nikolaos of Greece and Denmark
  The Prince of Wales (representing the Queen of the United Kingdom and Commonwealth Realms)
  The Earl and Countess of Wessex
  The Prince of Orange and his fiancée, Máxima Zorreguieta (representing the Queen of the Netherlands)
  Prince Constantijn and Princess Laurentien of the Netherlands
  The Hereditary Prince of Monaco (representing the Prince of Monaco)

References

External links
 Official website of the wedding

Norway
2001 in Norway
Marriage, unions and partnerships in Norway
2000s in Oslo
August 2001 events in Europe
Haakon, Crown Prince of Norway, and Mette-Marit Tjessem Høiby
Events in Oslo